Helpis minitabunda  is a jumping spider. A widespread species in the east and south east of Australia, New Zealand, and in Papua New Guinea, usually found on foliage in moist areas. 

Common names include threatening jumping spider and bronze jumping spider. The specific epithet minitabunda is derived from Latin, meaning "threatening". The male may show fearless or threatening behaviour when approached.

Unusually for spiders, the male is larger than the female. Male body length to 10 mm, females to 8 mm. The front two pairs of legs are particularly long. The male head has a flat topped caput covered with creamy white hairs. Below are large protruding chelicerae. The demeanor of the female is more cryptic than the male. The pre-mating courtship dance between male and female may last from two to three hours. Helpis minitabunda is an invasive species in New Zealand.

References

Salticidae
Spiders of Australia
Spiders described in 1880